Hoseynabad-e Zirki (also Romanized as Ḩoseynābād-e Zīrkī; also known as Ḩoseynābād and Ḩoseynābād-e Nakhlī) is a village in Eslamabad Rural District, in the Central District of Jiroft County, Kerman Province, Iran. At the 2006 census, its population was 418, in 88 families.

References 

Populated places in Jiroft County